The Boulder Public Library is the public library of Boulder, Colorado in the United States. The main branch and the Carnegie Branch Library for Local History are located in downtown Boulder, while the George Reynolds Branch is in south Boulder and Meadows Branch is in east Boulder.

History
The Boulder Public Library was originally housed in the Carnegie library on Pine Street, built in 1906, before moving to its present location on Canyon Boulevard in 1961. The original 1906 library was initially built with $15,000 donated by Andrew Carnegie. When the library moved to its present location, the architect selection committee selected James M. Hunter and Associates to execute the new design and construction of the new building. It was to be a two-story building of 23,800 square feet, with sculpture galleries, reading rooms, gathering spaces, video viewing rooms, and music listening rooms. On November 4th, 1959 the City Council voted to provide bonds of $450,000 to fund design and construction. The final cost of the building was $486,437.19. The library was dedicated on November 12th, 1961.

In late 2013, the main library temporarily housed the Boulder City Council while renovations are made to the main council building.

Collection and circulation
, the library's collection was composed of 333,432 items including 94,352 e-books. The circulation  was 1,446,816.

Branches
The Boulder Public Library system comprises four branches. An enclosed walkway spans the creek between the two library sections. This branch focuses on the history of Boulder and the surrounding area.

2014 renovations
Renovations funded by municipal bonds began in 2014. The renovations covered expansion and repairs to the main branch, and address aging electrical and data wiring. The renovations expanded other areas of the library and addressed other repairs. The renovations were funded by $2.45 million in municipal bonds, approved as part of a larger bond initiative by Boulder voters in a 2011 referendum.

Boulder Public Library District
The district was formed as a result of the November 2022 referendum. The new library district will be funded by a property tax mill levy.

References

External links

Public libraries in Colorado
Buildings and structures in Boulder, Colorado
Library buildings completed in 1961
Education in Boulder, Colorado